Min Reyes is a Canadian political commentator, blogger and tweeter active since 2010. She assisted in organizing and being hailed as the de facto spokesperson by Canadian media for the Occupy movement protest known as Occupy Vancouver in Vancouver, British Columbia, Canada and holds a B.A. in Communications from Simon Fraser University.

References

External links

People from New Westminster
Canadian people of Korean descent
Canadian bloggers
Simon Fraser University alumni
Canadian political commentators
Occupy movement
Canadian activists
Canadian women activists
Living people
Canadian women bloggers
Year of birth missing (living people)